The women's shot put event at the 2000 Summer Olympics as part of the athletics program was held at the Olympic Stadium on Thursday, 28 September, with the Qualification held on Wednesday, 27 September.

The qualifying athletes progressed through to the final where the qualifying distances are scrapped and they start afresh with up to six throws. The qualifying distance was 18.50m. For all qualifiers who did not achieve the standard, the remaining spaces in the final were filled by the longest throws until a total of 12 qualifiers.

Medalists

Schedule
All times are Australian Eastern Standard Time (UTC+10)

Abbreviations
All results shown are in metres

Records

Qualification

Group A

Group B

Final

References

Official Report of the 2000 Sydney Summer Olympics
todor66
 sports-reference

Athletics at the 2000 Summer Olympics
Shot put at the Olympics
2000 in women's athletics
Women's events at the 2000 Summer Olympics